Brownie is a 1905 bronze sculpture of an elf in a pointed cap by Louis Amateis, installed at the Houston Zoo, in the U.S. state of Texas. It is one of the first publicly owned sculptures in Houston.

See also

 1905 in art
 List of public art in Houston

References

1905 establishments in Texas
1905 sculptures
Bronze sculptures in Texas
Elves in popular culture
Hermann Park
Outdoor sculptures in Houston
Statues in Houston